Ryuho may refer to:
 Ryuho Okawa (born 1956), founder of Happy Science (a new Japanese religion)
 Ryūhō Masayoshi (born 1977), Japanese sumo wrestler
 Ryuho, a character from the anime series s-CRY-ed